Phạm Trọng Hoá (born 23 June 1998) is a Vietnamese footballer who plays as a midfielder for Phố Hiến, on loan from SHB Đà Nẵng.

References 

1998 births
Living people
Vietnamese footballers
Association football midfielders
V.League 1 players
SHB Da Nang FC players